Merillon Avenue is a station on the Long Island Rail Road's Main Line (Port Jefferson Branch service). It is located at Nassau Boulevard and Merillon Avenue in Garden City Park, New York. The station is wheelchair accessible with two side platforms and a cross-under at Nassau Boulevard.

History
Merillon Avenue station was established in 1911 near the former Clowesville station, which was established in June 1837 by the Brooklyn and Jamaica Railroad. It was the closest LIRR station to the old Queens County courthouse (Nassau County became a separate county in 1899, splitting off from Queens County) off Jericho Turnpike. By 1845, it was used only when courts were in session.

From 1874-1876, the station was named "Garden City" in order to mislead travelers into thinking that the station served Alexander Turney Stewart's Garden City, which was already served by Garden City station along the Central Railroad of Long Island in 1872. The court moved away in 1877 and the station fell by the wayside, although some trains continued to stop there as late as June 1897. Though re-established as a station in 1911, the station house itself was not built until 1912. The station was rebuilt in 1958, featuring a smaller structure, as well as a narrow, 11'6" bridge under the tracks for Nassau Boulevard; this bridge was replaced with a 14"-high bridge as part of the Main Line Expansion Project in October 2019, but still remains two lanes wide despite the fact that the rest of Nassau Boulevard is a four-lane divided highway.

LIRR massacre

The Merillon Avenue station was the final stop on the 5:33 p.m. train from Penn Station to Hicksville on December 7, 1993, before Colin Ferguson opened gunfire at passengers who were white or Asian in a racially motivated attack. Six people were murdered and 19 others were wounded. Colin was African American. Carolyn McCarthy, whose husband was killed and whose son was seriously injured in the tragedy, pressed for tougher gun control laws and was elected to the United States House of Representatives in 1996. There are often memorial wreaths on the platform at the head of the eastbound tracks of the station on the anniversaries of the incident.

Station enhancements 
As part of the Main Line third track project, the Merillon Avenue station was upgraded to accommodate full-length 12-car trains and platform B was relocated. Canopies, benches, signage, and security cameras were installed. The station was made compliant with the Americans with Disabilities Act of 1990 via the installation of elevators and ramps. The existing station building was demolished and replaced with extra parking spaces. Amenities such as Wi-Fi, USB charging stations, artwork, and digital information displays were also included in the renovation. The electrical substation at Merillon Avenue station was replaced to make way for the third track.

Platforms and tracks
This station has two high-level side platforms, each the length of ten train cars. During peak hours, both platforms can serve peak-direction trains in the opposite direction.

References

External links

New Hyde Park & Merillon Avenue Stations (Arrt's Arrchives)
 East end of station from Google Maps Street View
Platforms from Google Maps Street View

Garden City, New York
Long Island Rail Road stations in Nassau County, New York
Railway stations in the United States opened in 1912
1912 establishments in New York (state)